is a Japanese actor and voice actor affiliated with Theatre Company Subaru. He often dubs over African-American actors.

Filmography

Television animation
Allison & Lillia (Ian)
Ayakashi: Bake Neko (Yoshiaki Sakai)
Black Cat (Gilbar)
Dragon Ball Kai (Reacoom)
Hajime no Ippo (Shinoda)
Fullmetal Alchemist (Sig Curtis)
Fullmetal Alchemist: Brotherhood (Sig Curtis)
Initial D series (Atsurō Kawai)
InuYasha (Kawaramaru)
Inazuma Eleven (Reiji Kageyama)
Kaleido Star (Puck)
Kaizoku Sentai Gokaiger (Stargul) 
One Piece (Blueno, Squard, Mitsuboshi)
Overman King Gainer (Kizz Munt)
Pokémon Advanced Generation (Bolt)
Samurai 7 (Ayamaro)
Samurai Champloo (Oniwakamaru)
Shinryaku! Ika Musume (Harris)
Shinryaku!? Ika Musume (Harris)
Shaman King (Bunstar)
Tokumei Sentai Go-Busters (Messiah/Messiah Cell/Parabolaloid 2 (Messiahloid)/Messiah Reboot)

Tokusatsu
Kaizoku Sentai Gokaiger (Stargull (ep. 22))
Tokumei Sentai Go-Busters (Messiah (eps. 1 - 10, 12 - 13, 15 - 20 - 23, 27 - 30, 33, 36, 38 - 40, 42 - 44)/Messiah Cell (ep. 28 - 29)/Parabolaloid 2 (Messiahloid) (ep. 40)/Messiah Reboot (ep. 44))

OVA
Hajime no Ippo: Kimura Vs. Mashiba (Shinoda)
Tekken: The Motion Picture (Bruce Irvin)

Theatrical animation
Curse of the Sacred Sword (Bismark)
Fullmetal Alchemist the Movie: Conqueror of Shamballa (Sig Curtis)
Howl's Moving Castle (Port city fish seller)
Nasu: Summer in Andalusia (Zamenhoff)
Pokémon Ranger and the Temple of the Sea (Kai, Wailmer, Wailord)
Sakura Wars: The Movie (Commissioned army officer)

Video games
Bladestorm: The Hundred Years' War (Edward III of England)
Initial D Arcade Stage series (Atsuro Kawai)
Jak II (The Oracle, Krimson Guard)
One Piece: Pirates Carnival (Blueno)
Dragon Ball: Raging Blast 2

Dubbing roles

Live-action
Alien: Resurrection (First Mate Christie)
Black Nativity (Tyson)
Doctor Who (Cyberman)
Exit Wounds (2004 NTV edition) (Useldinger)
Power Rangers: Lost Galaxy (Magna Defender)
Stargate SG-1 (Teal'c)
Underworld (Kahn the Death Dealer)
The World Is Not Enough (2003 TV Asahi edition) (Charles Robinson (Colin Salmon))

Animation
Justice League (Martian Manhunter)
Spider-Man: The Animated Series (Lonnie Lincoln/Tombstone)
Teen Titans (Johnny Rancid)

References

External links
 

1965 births
Living people
Japanese male stage actors
Japanese male video game actors
Japanese male voice actors
Male voice actors from Saitama Prefecture
20th-century Japanese male actors
21st-century Japanese male actors